Your Arsenal is the third studio album by English singer Morrissey, released on 27 July 1992 by record label HMV.

The album received critical acclaim and reached number 4 on the UK Albums Chart.

Content 

Morrissey had been rehearsing with a new band prior to the release of Your Arsenal, which was the first official album of this new line-up.

Commencing with "You're Gonna Need Someone on Your Side", the album represents a clear change in direction for Morrissey from indie pop to a more muscular rock sound; with some elements of rockabilly. It also contains a glam rock influence, due to the involvement of ex-David Bowie guitarist Mick Ronson. Songs such as "Certain People I Know", "Glamorous Glue" and "I Know It's Gonna Happen Someday", which are respectively influenced by T. Rex, and David Bowie's Ziggy Stardust period songs (e.g. "The Jean Genie" and the last by "Rock 'n' Roll Suicide"). David Bowie later covered the track "I Know It's Gonna Happen Someday" on his 1993 album Black Tie White Noise.

Release 

Your Arsenal was released on 27 July 1992 by record label HMV. It reached number 4 on the UK Albums Chart.

The album earned a Grammy Award nomination for Best Alternative Music Album.

In 2014, Rhino Records issued a "Definitive Master" of the album. This version was remastered and substitutes the original album version of "Tomorrow" for the U.S. single mix. It also includes a bonus DVD of a 1991 concert from Shoreline Amphitheatre in Mountain View, California.

Critical reception 

Your Arsenal was praised by critics. Robert Christgau of The Village Voice called it his "most consistent solo set to date". Bill Wyman of Entertainment Weekly wrote that guitarist Alain Whyte "provides the very melodic, sometimes rockabilly-inflected settings Morrissey demands, and frequently they end up triumphant."

Referring to the album as "a dynamic, invigorating fusion of glam rock and rockabilly" and noting that it "rocks harder than any other record Morrissey ever made", Stephen Thomas Erlewine of AllMusic cited Your Arsenal as Morrissey's "finest solo record and his best work since The Queen Is Dead."

Your Arsenal was listed as one of the top 50 albums of 1992 by Q. The album was also included in the book 1001 Albums You Must Hear Before You Die.

Track listing

Personnel 
 Morrissey – vocals
 Alain Whyte – guitars
 Boz Boorer – guitars
 Gary Day – bass guitar
 Spencer Cobrin – drums
 Mick Ronson – production

Charts

Certifications and sales

|}

References

External links 

 

Morrissey albums
1992 albums
Albums produced by Mick Ronson
Glam rock albums by English artists